Survival of the Fittest is a British reality TV series that premiered on ITV2 on 11 February 2018. The programme comes from the same production company that is behind Love Island.

The series pits the girls and boys against each-other as a "Battle of the Sexes". They compete in various mental and physical challenges. The show is presented by Laura Whitmore, and is narrated by Brennan Reece.

The series is filmed in South Africa with contestants living in a luxurious lodge. The series finished on 2 March 2018 with the girls being crowned the winners of Survival Of The Fittest. Mettisse was voted the fittest girl of the girls team and chose to split her £40,000 cash prize with her team, so each girl received £10,000.

Billed as a sister-show to Love Island; the series was cancelled after one season due to low ratings.

Contestants
On 11 February 2018, 6 boys and 6 girls began competing in a battle of the sexes for a cash prize of £40,000.

The boys and girls compete against each other in a series of team challenges throughout the series. The winning team will automatically be safe from elimination while the losing team will face the public vote. The opposing team will then decide who is to be eliminated among those who are not saved by the public vote. When a contestant is eliminated, a new contestant will join the lodge as replacement.

After Shanice's arrival on Day 16, there will be no more replacements as the public votes for the "fittest boy" and "fittest girl", and only 4 girls and 4 boys will make the final.

Boys' team

Girls' team

Elimination chart
 Girls' team
 Boys' team

 Keywords
 WIN = The contestant won the team challenge and was immune from elimination.
 SAFE = The contestant lost the team challenge but was saved by public vote.
 BOTTOM 2/3/4 = The contestant lost the team challenge and was in the bottom of the public vote.
 ELIM = The contestant was eliminated.
 LEFT = The contestant left the lodge.

 Colour key
 The contestant won the team challenge and was immune from elimination.
 The contestant lost the team challenge but was saved by public vote.
 The contestant was immune from the public vote.
 The contestant lost the team challenge and was in the bottom of the public vote.
 The contestant was eliminated.
 The contestant left the lodge.
 The contestant does not feature in this team challenge.

Notes

Ratings 
Official ratings taken from the Broadcasters' Audience Research Board. These mostly include ITV2 and ITV2+1. Viewing figures shown are in millions.

References

External links

2018 British television series debuts
2018 British television series endings
2010s British reality television series
English-language television shows
ITV reality television shows
Television series by ITV Studios
Television shows set in South Africa